"It Should Have Been Me" is a 1963 song written by William "Mickey" Stevenson and Norman Whitfield for Kim Weston. It has been performed by Yvonne Fair, Gladys Knight & the Pips and Adeva among others. Knight's version peaked at number 40 on the Billboard Hot 100 in 1968. Fair had her only hit single with her recording of the song in 1976, reaching number 5 in the UK, number 85 in the US and number 10 in Australia.

The song begins:
"I saw my love walking down the aisle
And as he passed me by, he turned to me and gave me a smile"

Versions

Kim Weston (1963)
 Lead vocals by Kim Weston
 Backing vocals by The Supremes: Florence Ballard, Diana Ross, and Mary Wilson
 Instrumentation by The Funk Brothers

Gladys Knight & The Pips (1968)
 Lead vocals by Gladys Knight
 Backing vocals by Merald "Bubba" Knight, Edward Patten, and William Guest
 Instrumentation by The Funk Brothers and the Detroit Symphony Orchestra

Yvonne Fair (1975)
 Lead vocals by Yvonne Fair
 Instrumentation by The Funk Brothers

This version was used in The Vicar of Dibley 2006 episode "The Handsome Stranger",  with Dawn French miming the singing.

Adeva (1991)

In 1991, American dance music artist Adeva had the first of two number ones on the US Billboard Hot Dance Club Play chart with her version of "It Should Have Been Me". The song was released as the second single from her second album, Love & Lust (1991). In Europe, it peaked at number 48 in the UK and number four on the European Dance Radio Chart.

Critical reception
Alex Henderson from AllMusic stated that "she interprets the Gladys Knight & the Pips hit "It Should Have Been Me" with equally impressive results." Larry Flick from Billboard commented, "Dance chanteuse previews her sophomore effort, Love & Lust, with an attitudinal houser. Highly stylized, assertive vocals are countered by a physical bass line and a rousing gospel-spiced undercurrent. Demands immediate club approval—not to mention attention at crossover and urban radio."

Track listing
 Vinyl, Europe (1991)
A: "It Should've Been Me" — 3:22
AA: "It Should've Been Me" (Touchdown Edit) — 4:18

 12", UK (1991)
A: "It Should've Been Me" (Touchdown Mix) — 6:09
AA1: "It Should've Been Me" (Classic Club Mix) — 6:59
AA2: "It Should've Been Me" (Def Club Mix)

 CD single, US (1991)
"It Should Have Been Me" (Hype Radio Mix) — 4:08
"It Should Have Been Me" (Def Radio Mix) — 3:55
"It Should Have Been Me" (Extended Remix) — 6:30
"It Should Have Been Me" (Classic Club Mix) — 9:11
"It Should Have Been Me" (Def Club Mix) — 7:40
"It Should Have Been Me" (Def Zone Mental) — 6:35
"It Should Have Been Me" (Sound Factory Mix) — 5:08
"It Should Have Been Me" (LP Version) — 5:06

Charts

Miley Cyrus (2021)
 Lead vocals by Miley Cyrus.

See also
 List of number-one dance singles of 1991 (U.S.)

References

External links

1963 songs
1968 singles
1976 singles
1991 singles
Capitol Records singles
Gladys Knight & the Pips songs
House music songs
Songs written by Norman Whitfield
Songs written by William "Mickey" Stevenson